Tabulated below are the medals and overall rankings for host nations in each Summer Universiade and Winter Universiade, based on individual Games medals tables.

Summer Universiade

Winter Universiade

External links 
 The Geopolitics of Winter Olympic Medal Counts, The Atlantic, February 7, 2014
 One Benefit of Hosting the Olympics? More Medals, NPR, August 8, 2012

 Universiade
 
Medal tables at multi-sport events
Winter multi-sport events